Flexor carpi muscle may refer to:

 Flexor carpi radialis muscle
 Flexor carpi ulnaris muscle